The Compte rendu (full name Compte rendu au roi, translated as "report to the king") was a document published in February 1781 by Jacques Necker, finance minister to the King, in which he presented the state of France's finances.

Content of the report 

The report stated that ordinary revenues in France were exceeding expenditure by over 10 million livres. The health of the accounts as reported in the Compte rendu boosted confidence among lenders and ordinary people, who saw Necker as a strong financial manager due to his prior experience as a banker; the report bolstered his reputation further. As a consequence, the French government was able to raise new loans to pay for the costs of continued involvement in the American War of Independence.

However, Necker's reporting of the accounts obscured the financial problems which the country was facing: it did not report the extraordinary accounts, where the real cost of the war was to be found and which showed France in a significant deficit – between 1777 and 1781, Necker had raised 520 million livres in new loans. Had these been reported, lenders would have been unlikely to continue to lend money for the war.

Contribution to a revolutionary situation 

The Compte rendu was accepted because of Necker's reputation, but it also acted to bolster that reputation; despite the costs of war, it seemed that France remained in a strong financial position. Necker attained high popularity among ordinary people, who were particularly sympathetic to a minister who, unusual for someone in high office, had been a commoner.

After Necker left his position as finance minister, there was a succession of finance ministers under whom the true financial situation came to light. The Compte rendu was also arguably a factor in causing resistance to attempts in 1787 by the then-finance minister Calonne to reform the financial system. Calonne argued that the state finances were in a poor state and thus required overhaul to ensure greater efficiency in taxation. The Assembly of Notables, to whom the reforms were initially proposed, were sceptical of this explanation, possibly as a consequence of the belief that France remained in a strong position from the time of Necker.

After a succession of different finance ministers, Louis later re-appointed Necker in the view that he was in the best position to manage France's growing credit problems. Necker remained as popular as ever, which meant that when he was dismissed on 11 July 1789, a public outcry ensued. Combined with the simultaneous economic crisis – the price of grain had skyrocketed over the winter of 1787–88; this contributed to the storming of the Bastille on 14 July.

See also
 French Revolution
 Jacques Necker
 Storming of the Bastille

References

1781 in France
1781 documents